The United States Census Bureau defines an Urbanized Area to be "one or more places ('central place') and the adjacent densely settled surrounding territory ('urban fringe') that together have a minimum of 50,000 persons." There are a number of rules specifying what is included in the urban fringe, but it "generally consists of contiguous territory having a density of at least 1,000 persons per square mile". Urbanized Areas often form the cores of Metropolitan Statistical Areas, and as they comprise census tracts rather than local political subdivisions (counties, in Florida), they are generally smaller than the corresponding Metropolitan Statistical Area. A Metropolitan Statistical Area may have more than one Urbanized Area within its boundaries, and an Urbanized Area may extend into more than one Metropolitan Statistical Area. 

As of 2020, the US Census Bureau has defined thirty-three Urbanized Areas in Florida.

List
The United States Census Bureau defines an Urbanized Area to be "one or more places ('central place') and the adjacent densely settled surrounding territory ('urban fringe') that together have a minimum of 50,000 persons." There are a number of rules specifying what is included in the urban fringe, but it "generally consists of contiguous territory having a density of at least 1,000 persons per square mile". Urbanized Areas often form the cores of Metropolitan Statistical Areas, and, as they comprise census tracts rather than local political subdivisions (counties, in Florida), they are generally smaller than the corresponding Metropolitan Statistical Area. A Metropolitan Statistical Area may have more than one Urbanized Area within its boundaries, and an Urbanized Area may extend into more than one Metropolitan Statistical Area. 

As of 2020, the US Census Bureau has defined thirty-three Urbanized Areas in Florida.

References

 
 
Urbanized areas in Florida (by population)